Trevor Williams (born September 15, 1993) is an American football cornerback who is a free agent. He played football at Calvert Hall College High School in Towson, Maryland, where he was a two-year letterman and two-year team captain. He was named first-team All-State his senior year in 2011. Williams played college football at Penn State for four years. He was named Honorable Mention All-Big Ten in 2014 and 2015. He played in 49 games during his college career, recording 84 tackles and five interceptions. After going undrafted in the 2016 NFL Draft, he signed with the San Diego Chargers. He has also been a member of the Arizona Cardinals, Philadelphia Eagles, Jacksonville Jaguars, and Pittsburgh Steelers.

Early years
Williams was a two-year letterman and two-year team captain at Calvert Hall College High School in Towson, Maryland, where he played wide receiver and free safety. He garnered All-Metro and All-Maryland Interscholastic Athletic Association (MIAA) accolades for his junior season in 2010 as the team finished with an 11–1 record and won their first conference championship since 1982. As a senior in 2011, he earned All-MIAA, First Team All-State, and First Team All-Metro honors. He recorded 99 receptions for 1,180 yards and 15 touchdowns in his senior year. He also had 31 tackles, four interceptions and six pass breakups as a senior. After his senior season, he was invited to play in the Crab Bowl and the Chesapeake Bowl. In February 2011, he was the offensive Most Valuable Player at the Next Level Nation Elite Showcase.

In the class of 2012, Williams was rated a three-star wide receiver recruit by Rivals.com and 247Sports.com. He was rated a two-star wide receiver recruit by ESPN.com. He was also rated the No. 173 wide receiver in the country by ESPN.com and the No. 179 wide receiver in the country by 247Sports.com. He was also rated both a three-star wide receiver recruit and the No. 147 wide receiver in the country on 247Sports.com's composite rating, which takes into account the ratings of all the other major recruiting services in the country. He was rated a three-star safety recruit and the No. 86 safety in the country by Scout.com.

He committed to Penn State on January 22, 2012. He also received offers from Bryant, Morgan State, Toledo, VMI and West Virginia. He had initially committed to West Virginia in July 2011 but later switched to Penn State.

College career
Williams played for the Penn State Nittany Lions of Pennsylvania State University from 2012 to 2015. He played wide receiver in 2012 before moving to cornerback for his final three seasons.

In 2012, Williams appeared in 12 games, but started just one of them, and caught 10 passes for 97 yards. He also returned four kickoffs for an average of 19.8 yards. He converted to cornerback during spring practice in 2013. He played in 12 games, with six starts, during the 2013 season and recorded 24 tackles, eight pass breakups and two interceptions.

2014 saw Williams appear in 12 games, of which he started in all of them, and total 27 tackles, two interceptions, five pass breakups and one forced fumble. He was named the Big Ten Defensive Player of the Week after recording five tackles and two interceptions against Rutgers on September 13. He missed the game against Temple on November 15 due to an undisclosed injury. He earned Honorable Mention All-Big Ten honors.

He played in 13 games, and started all of them, in 2015 and recorded 33 tackles and one interception. He was named Honorable Mention All-Big Ten. He also won the Ridge Riley Memorial Award, which is given to the Penn State football player that "exhibits the core values of sportsmanship, scholarship, leadership and friendship.

He played in 49 career games for Penn State, recording 84 tackles and five interceptions. He graduated with a degree in recreation, parks and tourism management.

Professional career
He was ranked as the 30th best cornerback in the 2016 NFL Draft by NFLDraftScout.com.

San Diego / Los Angeles Chargers

2016
On May 10, 2016, the San Diego Chargers signed Williams after he went undrafted in the 2016 NFL Draft. They signed him to a three-year, $1.62 million contract.

Throughout training camp, Williams competed for a roster spot and a job as a backup cornerback against Greg Ducre, Richard Crawford, Terrell Chestnut, and Larry Scott. On September 3, 2016, the Chargers waived Williams as part of their final roster cuts. After clearing waivers, he was signed to their practice squad the following day.

On October 7, 2016, the Chargers promoted Williams to the active roster and signed him to a one-year, $540,000 contract to retain him through the 2017 contract. He was promoted from the practice squad after starting cornerback Jason Verrett partially tore his ACL five days earlier against the New Orleans Saints and was placed on injured reserve. Head coach Mike McCoy named Williams the fifth cornerback on the depth chart, behind Brandon Flowers, Craig Mager, Casey Hayward, and Steve Williams.

On October 9, 2016, Williams made his professional regular season debut during the Chargers' 34–31 loss at the Oakland Raiders, but appeared solely on special teams. The following week, he recorded his first career tackle in a 21–13 victory over the Denver Broncos. On November 27, 2016, Williams earned his first career start during a 21–13 win at the Houston Texans after Brandon Flowers was listed as inactive after sustaining a serious concussion the previous week. He recorded two tackles and a pass break up during the Week 12 victory. In Week 16, Williams collected a season-high seven combined tackles in the Chargers' 20–17 loss at the Cleveland Browns. The following week, he started his fourth consecutive game and recorded a season-high six solo tackles in a 37–27 loss to the Kansas City Chiefs. He finished his rookie season in 2016 with 31 combined tackles (26 solo) and five pass breakups in 12 games and five starts.

2017
On January 2, 2017, the Chargers fired head coach Mike McCoy. On January 12, 2017, Chargers' owner Dean Spanos announced that the team planned to immediately return to Los Angeles for the 2017 season and return as the Los Angeles Chargers. With the return of Jason Verrett, Williams entered training camp competing for the role as the third cornerback on the depth chart against Steve Williams, Craig Mager, Trovon Reed, and Desmond King. New head coach Anthony Lynn named Williams the third cornerback on the depth chart behind Jason Verrett and Casey Hayward to begin the regular season.

Williams was named the starting cornerback for Week 2 after Jason Verrett suffered a season-ending knee injury that required surgery in their season-opening 24–21 loss at the Denver Broncos. On October 1, 2017, Williams recorded a season-high seven solo tackles and a pass deflection 26–24 loss at the Philadelphia Eagles. In Week 6, Williams broke up two passes, made one tackle, and recorded his first career interception off a pass attempt by Derek Carr in the Chargers' 17–16 win at the Oakland Raiders. On November 19, 2017, Williams recorded a season-high three pass deflections, three solo tackles, and intercepted Buffalo Bills' quarterback Tyrod Taylor during Los Angeles' 54–24 victory. He started 15 games at cornerback opposite Casey Hayward, recording 56 tackles, 13 passes defensed, and two interceptions. Willams had an impressive first season as a full-time starter under new defensive coordinator Gus Bradley. Williams received an overall grade of 88.5 from Pro Football Focus, which was the 10th best overall grade among all qualifying cornerbacks in 2017.

2018
Williams returned as a starting cornerback in 2018 after Jason Verrett tore his Achilles tendon in the first day of training camp. Head coach Anthony Lynn named Williams and Casey Hayward the starting cornerback tandem to start the regular season.

On September 30, 2018, Williams recorded eight combined tackles, made a pass deflection, and returned an interception for an 86-yard gain during a 29-27 win against the San Francisco 49ers in Week 4. He started the first seven games before suffering a knee injury in Week 9. He missed four of the next five games before being placed on injured reserve on December 13, 2018.

2019
On September 11, 2019, Williams was placed on injured reserve. He was waived from injured reserve on October 7, 2019.

Arizona Cardinals
On October 8, 2019, Williams was claimed off waivers by the Arizona Cardinals. He was released on October 23.

Philadelphia Eagles
On January 10, 2020, Williams signed a reserve/future contract with the Philadelphia Eagles. On July 21, Williams was released. He was re-signed on August 26, 2020. He was waived again on September 4, 2020, and re-signed to the practice squad two days later. He was elevated to the active roster on September 19 for the team's week 2 game against the Los Angeles Rams, and reverted to the practice squad after the game. He was promoted to the active roster on September 24, 2020. He was placed on injured reserve on October 3, 2020, with a rib injury. He was released from injured reserve on October 20.

Jacksonville Jaguars
On December 7, 2020, Williams signed with the practice squad of the Jacksonville Jaguars. He was released on December 14, 2020.

Pittsburgh Steelers 
On January 6, 2021, the Pittsburgh Steelers signed Williams to their practice squad. On January 14, 2021, Williams signed a reserve/futures contract with the Steelers. He was released on May 7, 2021.

References

External links
Philadelphia Eagles bio
College stats

Living people
1993 births
Players of American football from Baltimore
American football cornerbacks
American football wide receivers
African-American players of American football
Arizona Cardinals players
Penn State Nittany Lions football players
San Diego Chargers players
Los Angeles Chargers players
Philadelphia Eagles players
Jacksonville Jaguars players
Pittsburgh Steelers players
21st-century African-American sportspeople